Stephanie Edwards (born November 5, 1987) is an American singer and was the eleventh-place finalist on sixth season of American Idol. She is from Savannah, Georgia and first began singing around the age of two or three. After graduating from Windsor Forest High School, Edwards pursued vocal instruction for a month and then went on to appear at the Apollo Theatre in New York when she competed in "It's Showtime at the Apollo". Prior to American Idol, she had won most singing contests she had entered, including "Savannah Star" in 2005.

American Idol
Edwards first auditioned for the reality show, American Idol, in Memphis, Tennessee. She is the only one of the top 12 contestants on Idol not presented in the TV tryouts preceding the naming of the top 24 semi-finalists.

During the initial broadcast for the Top 24, Edwards was praised for her rendition of “How Come U Don't Call Me Anymore,” by Prince. For her second semifinal performance, Edwards attempted the song “Dangerously in Love,” to which Randy Jackson exclaimed that she "sang her face off," although he felt her performance was too much like the original. The following week, Edwards pulled off another winning performance with the song "Sweet Thing". According to the judges, she was "darn near flawless and had a good command of the stage."

On March 8, 2007, Edwards made it into Top 12. For the first theme week, she performed Diana Ross' song "Love Hangover." Edwards forgot her words at one point during the song. The judges bashed her arrangement of the song, saying that she teased them with the good part and then never delivered. Despite the criticism, Edwards secured herself a spot in the Top 11.

She was eliminated from the show on March 21, 2007. She missed the summer tour along with Brandon Rogers.

American Idol performances

Post-American Idol
After American Idol, Edwards recorded a charity single called "On Our Way" which was written by Julie Wilde and became available in early-October 2007 as a CD single on eBay. Sales of the album benefit the Leukemia and Lymphoma Society's  Light the Night Walk . Her second single, "Here I Am", was released in April 2008.

As of 2008, she was studying towards a psychology degree at Armstrong Atlantic State University.

On March 29, 2010, Edwards was arrested in Savannah, for fighting in a public place, Jackson Park, neither of the two women involved reported being seriously injured.

In 2010, Edwards performed in the review show Southern Nights at the Savannah Theatre. She sang several classics, such as Georgia on My Mind, Midnight Train to Georgia and At Last.

References

External links

 The Leukemia & Lymphoma Society

1987 births
Living people
21st-century American singers
American Idol participants
Musicians from Baltimore
Singers from Georgia (U.S. state)
20th-century African-American women singers
Singers from Maryland
21st-century American women singers
21st-century African-American women singers